The 2005–06 CBA season is the 11th CBA season.

The season ran from November 20, 2005 to April 19, 2006. Dongguan Leopards joined CBA in this season and was divided into the South Division. The name of the league in Chinese is no longer the "Jia A" league (男子篮球甲A联赛) but the "professional league" (中国男子篮球职业联赛).

In the Regular Season, the eight South Division teams played 42 games each and the seven North Division teams played 40 games each. The Divisional Championships established in the previous season were abolished.

The all-star game was played on March 18, 2006 in Shanghai, after the end of the regular season and before the beginning of the playoffs: the South Division defeated the North Division 93-90.  Also, all-star games were played against the KBL, on January 22, 2006 in Korea and January 24, 2006 in Jiyuan, Henan, China.  Korea won the first game 96-86; China won the second game 104-85.

Regular Season Standings

Playoffs 
The quarter-finals were once again expanded to best-of-five series, and the finals were expanded to best-of-seven series for the very first time.

In the Final series, Guangdong Southern Tigers defeated Bayi Rockets (4-1), claimed its 3rd straight CBA championship.

Teams in bold advanced to the next round. The numbers to the left of each team indicate the team's seeding in regular season, and the numbers to the right indicate the number of games the team won in that round. Home court advantage belongs to the team with the better regular season record; teams enjoying the home advantage are shown in italics.

References

See also
Chinese Basketball Association

 
Chinese Basketball Association seasons
League
CBA